Ambos Camarines's 1st congressional district is a defunct congressional district that encompassed the northern and western portions of the former province of Ambos Camarines. It was represented in the Philippine Assembly from 1907 to 1916 and in the House of Representatives of the Philippine Islands from 1916 to 1919. The Spanish colonial province of Ambos Camarines was reorganized under the Insular Government of the Philippine Islands on April 27, 1901 and was divided into three districts. Tomás Arejola, who was a former member of the Malolos Congress for Ambos Camarines's at-large district in 1898, was elected as this district's first representative in 1907. Following its repartition into Camarines Norte and Camarines Sur on March 3, 1919, the district was abolished with its northern territory having been absorbed by Camarines Norte's at-large congressional district.

Representation history

See also
Legislative districts of Camarines Norte
Legislative districts of Camarines Sur

References

Former congressional districts of the Philippines
Politics of Camarines Norte
Politics of Camarines Sur
1907 establishments in the Philippines
1919 disestablishments in the Philippines
Congressional districts of the Bicol Region
Constituencies established in 1907
Constituencies disestablished in 1919